Charlotte Lewis  (September 10, 1955 – September 17, 2007) was an American basketball player who competed on the 1976 United States Olympic team.

High school 
Lewis attended Woodruff High School in 1974 but did not play basketball because the Peoria public schools did not yet offer a varsity basketball for females. Despite this lack of opportunity within the school, she played basketball on the playgrounds of Peoria, usually playing with boys. However, her ability came to the attention of Jill Hutchinson, who was working on building a program at Illinois State University. Lewis was invited to enroll at ISU to further her basketball career.

College 
While at ISU, Lewis help the Redbirds win four state championships. She set the record for most rebounds in a game (27) and in a season (345); records which are still school records as of 2017. Lewis earned a letter in each of her four years at Illinois state. In the 1976–77 season the team recorded a record of 20–6 which led to a national ranking, 11th in the AIAW. She was named a Kodak All-American in 1977 and listed as a finalist for the Wade Trophy (an award for the nation's top female athlete). Lewis's accomplishments led to her induction into the Missouri Valley Conference Hall of Fame in 2016.

USA Basketball

Pan Am
Lewis was named to the USA Basketball team roster. She would play for the team in the 1975 USA Women's Pan American Team. The games were originally planned for Santiago, Chile, then Sao Paulo, Brazil and finally held in Mexico City, Mexico in October. The Pan Am team had failed to win the gold in 1967 and 1971. This year, the team would be more successful, compiling a 7–0 record, and winning the gold medal for the first time since 1963.

Olympics
Lewis was named to the USA national team selected to play in the 1976 Olympics the first ever Olympic competition for a women's basketball team. While the team lost to the dominant Soviet Union team, they beat Czechoslovakia to win the silver medal.

Professional career
Lewis left school before graduating, and turned professional. She joined a professional team in France and played there for two years, before returning to the states and playing for the Iowa Cornets, a team in the Women's Professional Basketball League, the first professional basketball league for women in the US. While the story is certainly exaggerated, while playing for the Iowa team a Chicago sportswriter marveled at her strength, claiming that "when she spiked the ball in response to an officiating call, it took six seconds to return to the floor". The coach of the Cornets, Steve Kirk, ran a practice drill he called "War" which had exactly one rule— "anything goes". Lewis noted "he expected you to be able to make baskets when you are following and when you are filed. He expected you to be in that defensive position, to not let them go even when you are getting hit". After her pro career, she return to ISU and completed her degree.

References 

1955 births
2007 deaths
All-American college women's basketball players
American expatriate basketball people in Brazil
American expatriate basketball people in Spain
American women's basketball players
Basketball players at the 1975 Pan American Games
Basketball players at the 1976 Summer Olympics
Basketball players from Illinois
Centers (basketball)
Illinois State Redbirds women's basketball players
Medalists at the 1976 Summer Olympics
Olympic silver medalists for the United States in basketball
Pan American Games gold medalists for the United States
Pan American Games medalists in basketball
People from Peoria, Illinois
Medalists at the 1975 Pan American Games
United States women's national basketball team players
Women's Professional Basketball League players